The Treaty of Bakhchisarai or Treaty of Radzin, was signed in Bakhchisaray, which ended the Russo-Turkish War (1676–1681), on 3 January 1681 by Russia, the Ottoman Empire, and the Crimean Khanate.

They agreed to a 20-year truce and had accepted the Dnieper River as the demarcation line between the Ottoman Empire and Moscow's domain. All sides agreed not to settle the territory between the Southern Bug and Dnieper rivers. After the signing of the treaty, the Nogai hordes still retained the right to live as nomads in the southern steppes of Ukraine, while the Cossacks retained the right to fish in the Dnieper and its tributaries; to obtain salt in the south; and to sail on the Dnieper and the Black Sea. The Ottoman sultan then recognized Muscovy's sovereignty in the Left-bank Ukraine region and the Zaporozhian Cossack domain, while the southern part of the Kiev region, the Bratslav region, and Podolia were left under Ottoman control.
The Bakhchisaray peace treaty once again redistributed land between neighboring states. The treaty was also of great international significance and stipulated the signing of “Eternal Peace” in 1686 between Russia and Poland.

Treaty provisions 
The treaty was concluded for a period of 20 years and ended the wars of the 1670s between these states for possession of lands on the right bank of the Dnieper.
 the border between Russia and the Ottoman Empire was to constitute the river Dnipro, with Russia being awarded Kiev together with the towns of Stajki, Trypillia, Vasylkiv, Didowszczyzna, Radomyshl, located on the right "Ottoman" bank of the river, the Ottoman Empire recognized the sovereignty of Russia over Left-bank Ukraine.
 lands at Right-bank Ukraine between the Dnieper, Southern Bug, Kiev and Chyhyryn were to remain uninhabited.
 Sultan of the Ottoman Empire pledged not to support the enemies of Russia.
 Crimean Tatars and Nogais was granted the right to camp and hunt on the southern steppe of Ukraine on both sides of the Dnieper.
 the territory between Dniester and Southern Bug would remain uninhabited for 20 years, it was also not allowed to build fortifications there.
 Zaporozhian Cossacks formally became independent and received the right of free navigation across the Dnieper and its tributaries up to Black Sea, as well as the right to fish and the extraction and production of salt.
Russia agreed to pay tribute to the Crimean Khans for the past 3 years and annually after that.
 Cossacks received the right to fish, salt and free swimming on the Dnieper and its tributaries to Black Sea.

Aftermath 
Despite the treaty, Russia joined a European coalition against the Ottoman Empire in 1686.

See also
 List of treaties

References

Sources

Further reading
  Treaty of Bakhchisarai - Article in the Encyclopedia of Ukraine

Bakhchisarai
Bakhchisarai
1681 treaties
Crimean Khanate
Bakhchisarai
Russo-Turkish wars
1681 in Russia
1681 in the Ottoman Empire
17th century in the Zaporozhian Host